Earl of Woolton is a title in the Peerage of the United Kingdom. It was created on 9 January 1956 for the businessman and Conservative politician Frederick Marquis, 1st Viscount Woolton. He had already been created Baron Woolton of Liverpool in the County Palatine of Lancaster on 7 July 1939, Viscount Woolton of Liverpool in the County Palatine of Lancaster on 2 July 1953, and was made Viscount Walberton of Walberton in the County of Sussex at the same time as he was given the earldom. These title are also in the Peerage of the United Kingdom. As of 2014 the titles are held by his grandson, the third Earl, who succeeded his father in 1969.

The 1st Earl of Woolton lived at Walberton House, in Arundel, Sussex. The family seat is Auchnacree House, near Forfar, Angus.

Earls of Woolton (1956)
Frederick James Marquis, 1st Earl of Woolton (1883–1964)
Roger David Marquis, 2nd Earl of Woolton (1922–1969)
Simon Frederick Marquis, 3rd Earl of Woolton (b. 1958)

There is no heir to the earldom.

Arms

References

Earldoms in the Peerage of the United Kingdom
Noble titles created in 1956